Kalan (also Romanized as Kalān; also known as Kalan Ozomdeh, Kalyan, Keyāteyān, and Kialian) is a village in Ozomdel-e Jonubi Rural District, in the Central District of Varzaqan County, East Azerbaijan Province, Iran. At the 2006 census, its population was 62, in 14 families.

References 

Towns and villages in Varzaqan County